Yusuf Kemal Bey (1878–1969) was a Turkish civil servant, politician and academic. His birth name was Yusuf Kemal. After the Turkish Surname Law in 1934, he assumed the surname Tengirşenk.

Early life
He was born in Boyabat (now in Sinop Province), Ottoman Empire in 1878. While studying in the Military school of Medicine in İstanbul he was arrested by the Ottoman police for disobeying Abdülhamid II. Although he was sentenced to be exiled to Fezzan (a part of current Libya) he was pardoned due to his poor health. He studied law and graduated from the Faculty of law in İstanbul in 1904. He later took doctorate in political sciences in the University of Paris. 
After the Young Turk Revolution in 1908, following a brief term in parliament he served in high civil posts.

Political life

After the First World War he was elected as the MP in General Assembly of the Ottoman Empire as a representative of  Kastamonu Province. But the Ottoman parliament was closed by the Allies of World War I and he traveled to Ankara to join the Turkish nationalists. In the 1st and the 2nd cabinet of the Executive Ministers of Turkey he was elected as the Minister of Economy (3 May 1920 – 30 March 1921).  In the second half of the 3rd cabinet of the Executive Ministers of Turkey and in the  4th cabinet of the Executive Ministers of Turkey he was elected as the Minister of Foreign Affairs (30 March 1921 – 26 October 1922) . These cabinets were before the proclamation of the Turkish Republic. During the 6th government of Turkey, he was the Minister of Justice (27 October 1930-5 May-1931) .

Later years and death
After resignation from the parliament he served as the professor of Economy in the law school of Ankara University. Although he participated in the Constituent Assembly of Turkey as the representative of the Republican Villagers Nation Party he didn't return to political life. He died in 1969.

References

External links

1878 births
1969 deaths
Academic staff of Ankara University
Turkish civil servants
Ministers of Foreign Affairs of Turkey
Ministers of Justice of Turkey
People from Boyabat
Republican Villagers Nation Party politicians
Istanbul University Faculty of Law alumni
20th-century Turkish diplomats
Ambassadors of Turkey to the United Kingdom